Liscarroll Churchtown Gaels GAA, also known as LC Gaels, is a Gaelic Athletic Association club located in the villages of Churchtown and Liscarroll in County Cork, Ireland. The club is a member of Avondhu and field teams in hurling and Gaelic football.  The club was formed in 2011 from an amalgamation of players from Churchtown and Liscarroll clubs. As of 2022, they compete in the North Cork Junior A Hurling Championship and the North Cork Junior A Football Championship.

History 
Liscarroll Churchtown Gaels are a dual adult and juvenile GAA club located in the Avondhu division in North Cork. They have juvenile teams from under 7 up to under 17 and they have two adult teams in both hurling and football plus under 19 and under 21 teams.

Liscarroll Churchtown Gaels GAA club was formed in 2017 with the amalgamation of Liscarroll GAA and Churchtown GAA clubs, who previously competed separately at adult level. In 2011, both clubs joined to represent Churchtown GAA in hurling competitions and Liscarroll GAA in football competitions. Prior to this, each club had their own respective teams in both hurling and football competitions. The respective juvenile clubs were amalgamated under the name Granard Gaels until 2017 and subsequently as Liscarroll Churchtown Gaels GAA juvenile club.

Both clubs had successes individually over the years at adult level and the amalgamation claimed their first title in their maiden year 2017, capturing the Avondhu Junior C Hurling championship.

Honours 
 North Cork Junior A Hurling Championship
  Runners-Up (2): 2013, 2022
 North Cork Junior C Hurling Championship
  Winners (1): 2017
 North Cork Division 3 Hurling League
  Winners (1): 2018
 Under 18 Division 2 Hurling Championship
  Winners (1): 2020
 Under 18 Division 3 Football Championship
  Winners (1): 2021
 Under 17 Division 2 Hurling Championship
  Winners (1): 2021
 Under 15 Division 2 Hurling Championship
  Winners (1): 2021

References

External links
 Liscarroll Churchtown Gaels GAA
 O'Brien's pride of place comes shining through